This is a list of symphonies in G major written by notable composers.

See also
For symphonies in G minor, see list of symphonies in G minor. For symphonies in other keys, see List of symphonies by key.

Notes

References
 Bryan, Paul, Johann Waṅhall, Viennese Symphonist: His Life and His Musical Environment Stuyvesant: Pendragon Press (1997): 324–325
  

G major
Symphonies